Prince Stefanos Mengesha Seyoum (also Estifanos Mangasha Seyum, born 24 October 1952), is a member of the Imperial Family of Ethiopia. He serves as the Imperial Chancellor of Imperial Ethiopian Order of Saint Mary of Zion. He is the son of Ras Mengesha Seyoum and Princess Aida Desta. Through his father he is a great-great grandson of Emperor Yohannes IV, and through his mother, he is a great-grandson of Emperor Haile Selassie. He was awarded the Grand Cross of the Royal Confraternity of San Teotonio.

He was educated at the University of Toronto, Canada. He is an International Business Consultant and Director of the Canadian Royal Heritage Trust.

Honours 
 Deputy Grand Master of the Ethiopian Order of Baronets (Grazmatch).
 Chancellor of the Imperial Ethiopian Order of Saint Mary of Zion. 
 Chancellor of the Imperial Solomonic Order of Merit.
 Patron of the Sovereign Military Order of the Temple of Jerusalem (Priory of the Mountain of the House of the Lord).
 Knight Grand Cross of the Royal Confraternity of Sao Teotonio.
 Knight Grand Cross of the Royal Order of the Intare.
 Knigth Grand Cross of the Order of the Eagle of Georgia.

References

See also
 Line of succession to the former Ethiopian throne 
 Seyum Mangasha

1952 births
Living people
Stefanos Mengesha Seyoum
Stefanos Mengesha Seyoum